The South Africa national cricket team toured Sri Lanka for cricket matches in the 2006 cricket season. South Africa are scheduled to play two Test matches against Sri Lanka, one warm-up first class game over three days against Sri Lanka A, and at least four One Day Internationals as part of a triangular series. Sri Lanka took the Test series 2–0 after winning the final Test by one wicket, their second successive home Test series win against South Africa after their win in 2004.



Squads

Tour series

Sri Lanka A v South Africans

Test series

1st Test

2nd Test

Sri Lanka took the final Test by one wicket, in a match "neither side deserved to lose". South Africa opted to bat first, lost openers Gibbs and Hall for ducks, but captain Ashwell Prince shared a fifth-wicket stand of 141 with de Villiers, and Shaun Pollock also made an unbeaten half-century with the tail before Makhaya Ntini was caught on the final ball of the first day to close on 361.

Ntini then took four top-order wickets in the morning session, his final wicket being that of Sanath Jayasuriya three short of a half-century, and Sri Lanka were 86 for five, needing 275 for the final five wickets to restore parity. However, the sixth wicket stand between Chamara Kapugedera and Prasanna Jayawardene yielded 105 runs before both were bowled in successive over, and Farveez Maharoof and Chaminda Vaas then batted out 37 overs to add 117. Steyn then rounded off the tail, claiming his first Test five-for in 13.1 overs, and Sri Lanka were bowled out 40 short.

On the third day, Gibbs made a four-hour 92, as Muralitharan and Kapugedera stood for most of the wickets; Kapugedera had Jacques Rudolph and Hashim Amla run out, while Muralitharan got credited with seven wickets while bowling. The final wicket was that of Andrew Hall, the first of the innings, who was caught behind off Farveez Maharoof with the score on 76. Mark Boucher hit 65 with the tail before he was last out, setting Sri Lanka 352 to win in five sessions.

South Africa got an immediate breakthrough, with opener Upul Tharanga caught off Ntini for 0 in the third over. However, that was to be Ntini's only wicket; in his eighth over, he limped off with a hamstring injury, never to return. South Africa were left with four main bowlers, and as Steyn could not find his first innings effectiveness, and Mahela Jayawardene stood up with a six-hour 123, Sri Lanka managed the chase. At lunch on day five, they needed 19 with four wickets in hand, but Jayawardene was caught by Gibbs in the eighth over after lunch, with 11 still needed. Andrew Hall then claimed the wickets of Vaas and Muralitharan in the same over, but also conceded two runs. Maharoof hit Boje for a single, and Lasith Malinga could hit the winning run on the only ball he faced in the innings.

Withdrawal from Unitech Cup
Originally, South Africa was set to play Sri Lanka and India in the tri-nation Unitech Cup one-day cricket tournament. Following a series of bomb blasts in the Sri Lankan capital, relating to the renewal of terrorist activity plaguing that country, Cricket South Africa employed an independent security consultant to determine the risk posed to players. The risk to the team was determined to be "unacceptable" and South Africa's involvement in the tour came to a premature end. Following South Africa's withdrawal, Sri Lanka and India were scheduled to play a One-day International series, but this was rained off.

References

2006 in South African cricket
2006 in Sri Lankan cricket
International cricket competitions in 2006
Sri Lankan cricket seasons from 2000–01
2006